Bouvet was a sail and steam aviso of the French Navy, lead ship of her class. She is remembered as the opponent of the German gunboat SMS Meteor during the Battle of Havana in 1870, at the outbreak of the Franco-Prussian War.

Career 
Commissioned on 18 June 1866, Bouvet served in Mexico, in the Caribbean and off Terre-Neuve.

At the outbreak of the Franco-Prussian War, she was sent to the Caribbean, where she intervened to rescue the liner SS Nouveau Monde. Under Commander Franquet, she fought against SMS Meteor during the Battle of Havana, managing to ram her opponent and knocking out two of her masts, but suffering herself a shot in a steam pipe which forced her to return into Cuban waters and avoid capture.

Bouvet was wrecked on 17 September 1871 off Île-à-Vache, when a gust of wind sent her onto a reef. The crew managed to safely abandon ship.

Notes and references

Notes

References

Bibliography 
 

Ships built in France
1865 ships
 
Shipwrecks in the Caribbean Sea
Maritime incidents in September 1871